The Columbia Football League was a short-lived NAIA intercollegiate athletic football conference that existed during the 1985 through 1987 seasons and was composed of member schools from the states of Oregon and Washington. The league's teams were divided into two divisions based on geography, the Northern and Southern Divisions.

Champions

Northern Division
 1985 – 
 1986 – 
 1987 –

Southern Division
 1985 – 
 1986 – Linfield
 1987 –

Standings

See also
Evergreen Conference
Columbia Football Association
List of defunct college football conferences

References

Defunct college sports conferences in the United States
College sports in Oregon
College sports in Washington (state)